Louis Brown Schwartz (February 24, 1913 – January 23, 2003) was the Benjamin Franklin and University Professor of Law at the University of Pennsylvania Law School.

Biography

Schwartz was born in Philadelphia, Pennsylvania, to  Samuel (Shimon) Schwartz and Rose Brown.
Schwartz and his wife, Mimi, had two daughters, Johanna and Victoria Schwartz.

He graduated from the Wharton School (1932) and the University of Pennsylvania Law School (1935). Schwartz then worked as an attorney for the Securities and Exchange Commission and as head attorney in the criminal division for the U.S. Justice Department in Washington, D.C.  He spent two years as an officer in the U.S. Navy.

Schwartz was the Benjamin Franklin and University Professor of Law at the University of Pennsylvania Law School, having joined the faculty in 1946. He taught courses in antitrust, criminal law, and professional responsibility. He retired in 1983. The New York Times said he was "an influential legal scholar whose work helped bring about significant changes in the penal codes of many states."

Among his many writings were Free enterprise and economic organization: government regulation with John J. Flynn and Harry First (Foundation Press, 1985), Law enforcement handbook for police with Stephen R. Goldstein (West Pub. Co., 1970), and Free Enterprise and Economic Organization: Concentration and restrictive practices (Foundation Press, 1966).

Schwartz died on January 23, 2003, at 89 years of age in San Francisco, California.

References 

Lawyers from Philadelphia
American legal scholars
Scholars of criminal law
Scholars of competition law
University of Pennsylvania Law School alumni
University of Pennsylvania Law School faculty
Wharton School of the University of Pennsylvania alumni
20th-century American lawyers
United States Navy officers
1913 births
2003 deaths
U.S. Securities and Exchange Commission personnel
United States Department of Justice lawyers